Lightnin' Bill Carson is a 1936 American Western film directed by Sam Newfield.

Plot summary
A lawman captures the notorious "Pecos Kid", who is tried and hanged for his crimes – then starts to have doubts as to whether the Kid actually committed the crimes.

Cast 
Tim McCoy as U. S. Marshal "Lightnin" Bill Carson
Lois January as Dolores Costello
Rex Lease as The Pecos Kid / Fred Rand
Harry Worth as Silent Tom Rand
Karl Hackett as Stack Stone
John Merton as Henchman Breed Hawkins
Joseph W. Girard as Banker Mount
Lafe McKee as Don Costello

External links 

1936 films
1930s English-language films
American black-and-white films
1936 Western (genre) films
American Western (genre) films
Films directed by Sam Newfield
1930s American films